Le Cercle is a secretive, invitation-only foreign policy forum. Its focus has been opposing communism and, in the 1970s and 1980s, supporting apartheid when the group had intimate ties with and funding from South Africa. The group was described by British Conservative MP Alan Clark as "an Atlanticist society of right-wing dignitaries".

History 
Le Cercle was established in 1952-53 by then French prime minister Antoine Pinay and French intelligence agent Jean Violet under the name Cercle Pinay.   Konrad Adenauer and Franz Josef Strauss were co-founders and reconciliation between France and Germany was an important goal. Historian Adrian Hänni wrote that "The Cercle's founding vision encompassed the integration of a Christian-Catholic Europe, an aspiration reflected in the Cercle's personal membership and the countries represented in its early years." The other members of the original Cercle were from the Governments of Belgium, Italy, Luxembourg and the Netherlands including a number of members of the Catholic Opus Dei and the Knights of Malta. However, in later years it delved into policy discussions in promoting reforms in post-Communist countries, and in June 2004 convened in the Royal Palace in Belgrade under the auspices of Alexander, Crown Prince of Yugoslavia .

Political changes in 1969 led to the addition of Portugal, Spain, Switzerland, the United Kingdom and the United States with meetings held twice a year rather than three times a year as before. This led to a shift in objectives, which became an emphasis on forming a strong anti-Communist alliance between the United States and Europe. Hänni stated that "The leaders of the group increasingly considered strategies to target public opinion and, to this end, formed a "Cercle network" of associated organisations, institutes and think tanks, which attacked both the Soviet Union and the perceived "leftist" governments or opposition movements in Europe and the Third World." Its members then and now tended to be strident anti-Communists, including members of the World Anti-Communist League. The Union of South Africa provided the only official delegation and the Cercle supported organisations such as Renamo, whose general secretary attended meetings, and  Unita. 

In later years, the British took over the chairmanship of Le Cercle. Leading members included the ex-MI6 officer Anthony Cavendish, the British Conservative MP Julian Amery, and Brian Crozier.

Alan Clark, the British Conservative MP and historian stated in his diaries that Le Cercle was funded by the CIA.

Le Cercle was mentioned in the early 1980s by Der Spiegel in Germany as a result of the controversy surrounding Franz Josef Strauss, one of the regular attendants of the Cercle. In the late 1990s, the Cercle received some attention after a scandal had broken out involving Jonathan Aitken, at the time chairman of Le Cercle. Members that were contacted by newspapers refused to answer any questions.

Ecuadorian Foreign Minister, Guillaume Long, wrote that the group has "strong links to the intelligence community in Europe and the United States".

Sample agenda from 1979 
An agenda presented by Brian Crozier noted that its goal to change the British Government had been changed by the election of Margaret Thatcher and  among others listed the following objectives:

 "Undercover financial transactions for political aims";
 "International campaigns aiming to discredit hostile personalities or events";
 "Creation of a (private) intelligence service specialising in a selective point of view"

Chairs
1953–1971: Antoine Pinay
1971–1980: Jean Violet
1980–1985: Brian Crozier
1985–1993: Julian Amery
1993–1996: Jonathan Aitken
1996–2008: Norman Lamont
2008–2013: Michael Ancram
2013–2014: Rory Stewart
2015–2018: Nadhim Zahawi

Members
Former UK Minister of State for Europe and North America, Alan Duncan, is a member.

References

Further reading 
 Johannes Großmann (2014). Die Internationale der Konservativen. Transnationale Elitenzirkel und private Außenpolitik in Westeuropa seit 1945. Munich: Walter de Gruyter. pp. 437-496. .
David Teacher (2003). Rogue Agents: The Cercle and the 6I in the Private Cold War, 1951-1991. 6th ed.

External links 
 #Declassified: Apartheid Profits - Le Cercle: the phantom profiteers

Apartheid in South Africa
Anti-communist organizations
Secret societies